Master of Ceremonies is the fourth studio album by American rapper Styles P. The album was released on October 4, 2011, by D-Block Records and E1 Music. The album features guest appearances from Lloyd Banks, Rick Ross, Busta Rhymes, Pharoahe Monch, Pharrell Williams and Styles' group The L.O.X. Producers on the album include  Pete Rock, Statik Selektah, Warren G, Dipset AraabMuzik, and more. The lead single from Master of Ceremonies, is "Harsh", which features Rick Ross and Busta Rhymes. A second single has also been released. The song is called "It's OK", which features Jadakiss.

Critical response 

Master of Ceremonies was met with generally positive reviews from music critics. David Jeffries of AllMusic gave the album four out of five stars, saying "Big money names like Pharrell, Busta Rhymes, and Rick Ross himself fill the guest list, but Styles is as uncompromising and hard as always, filling the middle of this effort with dark, stark, and dirty reminders of life in the ghetto and/or life as a gangster." Alex Thornton of HipHopDX gave the album three and a half stars out of five, saying "Styles is doing his best to represent the collective properly with his latest solo. While it feels like Master of Ceremonies could have been more, it's a solid effort worth checking out both for fans of Styles specifically and New York rap in general." Ralph Bristout of XXL gave the album an XL rating, saying "Despite a loaded list of features and the underwhelming Avery Storm-assisted "How I Fly," Master of Ceremonies exhibits more wins than duds. Holiday certainly lives up to the album's title."

Commercial performance 
The album debuted at number 33 on the Billboard 200, selling 11,300 copies in its first week.

Track listing

Charts

References 

2011 albums
Styles P albums
Albums produced by AraabMuzik
Albums produced by Pete Rock
Albums produced by Warren G
Albums produced by Statik Selektah